Alexandre Ferreira may refer to:

 Alexandre Ferreira (fighter), Brazilian mixed martial artist
 Alexandre Rodrigues Ferreira (1756–1815), Portuguese naturalist
 Alexandre Ferreira (volleyball) (born 1991), Portuguese volleyball player